Jessie Danielson is an American politician from the State of Colorado. She is an elected member of the Colorado State Senate representing District 22 after being redistricted from District 20. Previously, she served in the Colorado House of Representatives representing District 24 in Jefferson County. A Democrat, Danielson was first elected in the November 4, 2014 general election.

She was redistricted to the 22nd district in the 2022 Colorado Senate election, succeeding Brittany Pettersen.

Biography
Danielson is a resident of Wheat Ridge. She was born in Greeley and was raised on her family's farm near Ault, graduating from Highland High School. She is a graduate of the University of Colorado Boulder. Her work experience includes America Votes working on election strategy and public policy, NARAL Pro-Choice Colorado as Political Director, and an independent living center that assists the disabled in living independently.

Danielson is a former chair of the board of directors for Emerge Colorado and a former board member of both NARAL Pro-Choice Colorado and ProgressNow Colorado. She has served as a gubernatorial appointee on both the Colorado Commission on Aging and the Voter Access and Modernized Elections Commission.

Election history

2014 election
On January 12, 2014, incumbent State Representative Sue Schafer opted out of seeking a fourth term. On January 21, 2014, Danielson announced her candidacy in a press release.

Democratic primary
On January 12, 2014, local Edgewater City Councilmember and Democrat Kristian Teegardin filed his candidacy for the seat. Danielson's filing created a primary race for the Democratic nomination. To qualify for the primary ballot in Colorado, candidates are required to win at least 30% of the vote of seated delegates at nominating assemblies held by political parties. At the March 29, 2014 Democratic assembly, Danielson received 58 out of 99 votes cast (or 58.6%), with Teegardin winning the rest; meaning both candidates qualified for the Democratic primary ballot. Danielson, with the most votes, won "top line" on the primary ballot.

The Democratic primary was held as an all mail-in ballot election ending at 7:00 P.M. on June 24, 2014. Danielson defeated Teegardin, thereby becoming the Democratic nominee for the November 4, 2014 general election.

General election
Having won the Democratic Party primary, Danielson faced Republican Joe DeMott—who was unopposed in the Republican Party primary—on the 2014 general election ballot. Danielson went on to win this election, which ended on November 4, 2014.

2016 election
Danielson ran for a second two-year term in the 2016 general election. She was unopposed in the Democratic primary election. Republicans nominated Joy Bowman as the Republican candidate for the general election during their nominating assembly. Bowman later withdrew from the race, and the Republican HD-24 vacancy committee appointed Danielson's 2014 opponent, Joe DeMott, to fill the Republican vacancy on the 2016 general election ballot.

General election
Danielson defeated DeMott in the 2016 election, winning a second term.

2018 election
On May 24, 2017, Danielson filed her candidacy for the Colorado State Senate, District 20, instead of running for a third term in the State House. Incumbent Senator Cheri Jahn was prohibited from running again by term limits. Danielson was unopposed in the 2018 Democratic primary for Senate District 20.

With Republicans holding a one-seat majority in the State Senate, the district was one of five competitive seats in the Colorado State Senate election that were watched closely around the country as Democrats worked to "flip" the chamber to Democratic control. Danielson went on to win her race, which ended on November 6, 2018.

General election
In the 2018 general election, Danielson faced Republican Christine Jensen and Libertarian Charles Messick, winning a term in the state senate by eight points.

Legislative career
The bicameral Colorado General Assembly meets each January for a 120-day regular session.

70th General Assembly
After the 2014 general election, Colorado's 70th General Assembly convened on January 7, 2015, at which time Danielson was sworn in. The new Speaker of the House, Dickey Lee Hullinghorst, appointed Danielson to the following committees:

 Agriculture, Livestock, & Natural Resources
 Public Health Care & Human Services
 Local Government

71st General Assembly
After the 2016 general election, Colorado's 71st General Assembly convened on January 11, 2017, at which time Danielson was sworn in. The new Speaker of the House, Crisanta Duran, appointed Danielson Speaker Pro Tempore of the House and to three of its committees:

 Agriculture, Livestock, & Natural Resources
 Public Health Care & Human Services (Vice Chair)
 Appropriations

72nd General Assembly
After the 2018 general election, Colorado's 72nd General Assembly convened on January 4, 2019, at which time Danielson was sworn in as State Senator for Colorado's District 20. Democrats controlled the majority of seats. Danielson was appointed to two committees:

 Agriculture & Natural Resources (Vice Chair)
 Business, Labor & Technology (Vice Chair)

2019 session
During the 2019 Regular Session, Danielson's successful passage of the Equal Pay for Equal Work Act was a notable victory, as was legislation criminalizing the abandonment and confinement of the at-risk and elderly.

Awards and recognition
Danielson has received the following awards and recognition during her time in office:

 2018 Trailblazer of the Year Award, Emerge Colorado
 2017 Legislator of the Year, Colorado Community College System
 2017 Legislative Leadership Award, Colorado County Clerks Association
 2017 Legislator of the Year Award, Developmental Disabilities Resource Center
 2016 Friend of Labor Award, Jefferson County Democratic Party
 2016 Friend of the Farm Bureau, Colorado Farm Bureau

References

External links
 
 Jessie Danielson at the Colorado General Assembly
 Ballotpedia.org: Jessie Danielson

21st-century American politicians
21st-century American women politicians
Democratic Party Colorado state senators
Living people
Democratic Party members of the Colorado House of Representatives
People from Weld County, Colorado
People from Wheat Ridge, Colorado
University of Colorado Boulder alumni
Women in Colorado politics
Women state legislators in Colorado
Year of birth missing (living people)